The Deputy Director of the National Security Agency (DDIRNSA) is the highest-ranking civilian within the National Security Agency. As the senior civilian at NSA, the deputy director acts as the agency's chief operating officer, guiding and directing strategies and policy, and serves as the principal advisor to the Director of the NSA. The deputy director reports to the NSA director and is required to be a technically experienced civilian.

The current deputy director is George C. Barnes.

NSA deputy directors

Deputy directors of AFSA
The Armed Forces Security Agency (AFSA) was the predecessor to the NSA.

*From November 1950 to April 1951, there was a Deputy Director for each service.

Deputy directors of NSA

References 

National Security Agency